William Paley Baildon FSA (1859–1924) was a barrister of Lincoln's Inn, legal historian, and author. He was a fellow of the Society of Antiquaries of London and the editor of The Home Counties Magazine (1906–1912). A collection of papers relating to Baildon and the Baildon family, whose history he wrote, are held by the West Yorkshire Archive Service in Bradford.

Selected publications
 Select Civil Pleas. Vol. I A. D. 1200-1203. Bernard Quaritch, London, 1890.
 Select Cases in Chancery: A.D. 1364 to 1471. Bernard Quaritch, London, 1896. 
 Court Rolls of the Manor of Wakefield, vol. I. 1274 to 1297. (editor) The Yorkshire Archæological Society. Record Series, vol. XXIX (1901). xx, 334 pp. 
 Baildon and the Baildons; A History of a Yorkshire Manor and Family. 1912.
 Inquisitions Post Mortem Relating to Yorkshire, of the Reigns of Henry IV and Henry V. 1918. (Edited with John William Clay)

References

External links 

W. Paley Baildon at The Online Books Page.
Landed families of Britain and Ireland: Baildon of Baildon.

1859 births
1924 deaths
Fellows of the Society of Antiquaries of London
English non-fiction writers
English magazine editors
English barristers
Legal historians
Historians of Yorkshire